Arthur Longbrake was a songwriter and lyricist. He established the Eclipse Music Company. He wrote the words to "I'd like to know where I met you" and "On the Beach 'Neath the Old Willow Tree".

"Brother Noah Gave Out Checks for Rain" recounts the story of a church deacon with a leaky roof and a baseball game with Biblical figures.

Several performances of the songs he wrote were recorded with Arthur Collins singing them. They are minstrel songs. Joseph Smith published several.

Songs
"Nobody Knows Where John Brown Went"
"Brother Noah Gave out Checks for Rain"
"Parson Jones' Three Reasons" (1908)
"Powder River, let's go; song foxtrot
"It's Morning (The Song with the Rooster Crow)" (1908)
"My Affinity" (1908)
"When the Sunshine in your Heart Turns Night Into Day" (1908), lyrics
"You're Going on a Long, Long Journey  Soon", words by Arthur Longbrake and music by Arthur Hauk
"I'd Like to Know Where I Met You", lyrics by Arthur Longbrake and music by A. Jackson Peabody Jr.
"Come Down and Pick Your Husband Out, the Rest of Us Want to Go Home" (1909), lyrics
"When You're Dreaming Dream of Me" (1906), lyrics
"Fever's On" (1906), lyrics
"Rose of the Night" (1917), lyrics
"Iam Longing for Tomorrow When I Think of Yesterday", lyrics
"Singing Bird" (1909), lyrics
"It Was Your Pleasing Smile" (1909), lyrics

See also
Coon song

References

American lyricists
American music publishers (people)